Jorge Larrosa Bolea (born 16 December 1985) is a Spanish former footballer who played as a goalkeeper.

Football career
Born in Huesca, Aragon, Larrosa played the vast majority of his career in lower league football. He spent six seasons under contract to local club SD Huesca and, on 31 October 2009, he appeared in his first and only match in Segunda División: after Miguel was sent off in the 23rd minute of the away fixture against Córdoba CF, he replaced field player Lluís Sastre and conceded twice in a 1–2 loss.

In 2012, Larrosa signed with neighbouring UD Barbastro in Tercera División.

References

External links

1985 births
Living people
People from Huesca
Sportspeople from the Province of Huesca
Spanish footballers
Footballers from Aragon
Association football goalkeepers
Segunda División players
Segunda División B players
Tercera División players
SD Huesca footballers
UD Barbastro players
AD Almudévar players